The Big Sandy River may refer to one of the following rivers in the United States:

The Big Sandy River (Ohio River), on the border between Kentucky and West Virginia
The Big Sandy River (Tennessee), a tributary of the Tennessee River
The Big Sandy River (Wyoming), a tributary of the Green River
The Big Sandy River (Arizona), a tributary of the Bill Williams River

See also 

Big Sandy Creek (disambiguation)
Little Sandy River (disambiguation)
Sandy River (disambiguation)